As of January 2020 TUI fly Deutschland operates to the following scheduled destinations:

References

Lists of airline destinations